Henry Thomas Hodgkinson (March 1862 – 11 October 1945) was an English footballer who was one of Port Vale's first players.

Career
Hodgkinson was one of Port Vale's original players when it was founded in the 1870s. The first recorded game he played was a friendly on 27 October 1883, which was lost 4–1 at home to Preston North End. He appeared regularly in the team and helped the club win the Burslem Challenge Cup and share the North Staffordshire Charity Challenge Cup in 1885. He also helped the club reach the FA Cup fifth round in 1886, eventually Vale pulled out of the replay against Brentwood. He lost his first team spot in September 1887 and was forced to retire through injury in 1888.

Career statistics
Source:

Honours
Port Vale
Burslem Challenge Cup: 1885
North Staffordshire Charity Challenge Cup: 1885 (shared)

References

1862 births
1945 deaths
Sportspeople from Burslem
English footballers
Association football midfielders
Port Vale F.C. players